Ranya District is a district of Sulaymaniyah Governorate, Iraqi Kurdistan, Iraq. Its capital is Ranya. The district has a population of 200,826. The district includes three towns, Çiwarqurne, Bêtwate and Hacî awa, and is the centre of the Bîtwên and Raperîn area. The region of Ranya has been inhabited since ancient times and is rich in archaeologic sites such as Tell Shemshara, Tell Bazmusian, Qalatga Darband, Girdedême, Kameryan and Boskin hills and Ranya castle. Its history as a district dates from the Ottoman Empire period in (1789) when the first district commissioner was appointed. The main tribes in Ranya are the Jaff, Bilbas, Ako and Shawri. Agriculturally, the area is well known for its fertile soil. The principle crops are sunflowers, tobacco, rice, wheat and barley.

References

Geography of Iraqi Kurdistan
Districts of Sulaymaniyah Province
1942 establishments in Iraq
Populated places established in 1942